Body check may refer to:
Checking (ice hockey)
Physical examination